Dream Zone is an adventure video game developed by JAM Software and published by Baudville. The game was released in 1988 for the Apple IIGS and then ported to the MS-DOS, Amiga, and Atari ST.

Plot
The player becomes trapped in his own dream, thanks to a scientist's rotten elixir, and must escape the weird world of his own imagination to reach reality again. The dream is full of nightmarish creatures and contains magic, airships, a floating castle, and a troublesome bureaucracy.

Reception
Compute! stated that the game "truly conveys a dream-like feeling". The magazine praised its satire and the IIGS version's graphics, and stated that "it's hard to believe that the program was written by two high school juniors". A later Compute! review praised the graphics, story, and interface. The game was reviewed in 1988 in Dragon #134 by Hartley, Patricia, and Kirk Lesser in "The Role of Computers" column. The reviewers gave the game 5 out of 5 stars.

The game sold upwards of 10,000 copies, earning the developers about $15,000.

Reviews
Commodore User - Jan, 1989
Computer and Video Games - Feb, 1989
ASM (Aktueller Software Markt) - Feb, 1989
Tilt - Apr, 1989
ACE (Advanced Computer Entertainment) - Feb, 1989
ST/Amiga Format - Mar, 1989
Zzap! - Feb, 1989

References

External links
Dream Zone at MobyGames
Review in Info

1987 video games
Adventure games
Amiga games
Apple IIGS games
DOS games
Naughty Dog games
Video games about nightmares
Video games developed in the United States
Video games set in castles